The Donggang line was a railway line of the Taiwan Railways Administration that ceased operations in July 2002. The line was a branch line of the Pingtung Line, diverging at Zhen'an Station to the coastal town of Donggang. The route ran parallel to the current-day Provincial Highway 17.

History 
During Japan's rule over Taiwan, the Pingtung Line gradually extended from Pingtung City southward to Fangliao. Donggang residents petitioned to the government for the tracks to enter the town, and Donggang Line entered service on 19 July 1940 as a branch line of the system. At the time of opening, the line had only two stations, Shebian (社邊, now Zhen'an) and Donggang; a third station named Dapeng was added on 1 December 1942. Aside from passenger services, the line also branched off into an air force complex located at the current Penbay International Circuit.

In 1983, the completion of the Shuangyuan Bridge across the Gaoping River made car travel to Kaohsiung much faster and caused a decline in ridership on the Donggang line. Afterwards, there were only ten round-trip services on the line, primarily served by a single DR2600 series car. Passenger services finally ceased on 1 March 1991. The line continued to carry military supplies into the air force base until July 2002.

Development plans 
Former President Ma Ying-jeou once proposed that the Donggang Line be reopened, but the plan was rejected by Donggang residents.

In 2016, the Ministry of Transportation and Communications again proposed to reopen the Donggang Line as a light rail. Known as the "Donggang Tourism Line" (東港觀光鐵道), the route mostly followed the old railway line but terminated at Linbian instead of Zhen'an. However, Donggang residents also opposed this plan, and the route was deemed not economically viable.

A planned extension of the Kaohsiung MRT Red line will follow the route of the Donggang Line between Donggang and Dapeng Bay.

Stations

References 

TRA routes
Railway lines opened in 1940
Railway lines closed in 2002
3 ft 6 in gauge railways in Taiwan
1940 establishments in Taiwan
2002 disestablishments in Taiwan